CX 44, known as "La Catorce 10" (La 1410), is a Uruguayan Spanish language AM radio station that broadcasts from Montevideo, Uruguay.

References

External links

Spanish-language radio stations
Radio in Uruguay
Mass media in Montevideo